Girella nebulosa, the Rapanui nibbler, is a species of ray-finned fish within the Kyphosidae family. It is found in the Southeast Pacific off Easter Island, and can grow up to a length of 30 centimeters.

References 

Girella
Fish described in 1912
Kyphosidae
Fish of the Pacific Ocean
Fish of Chile